R. Govindan (1928-10 November 2005) was an Indian politician and leader of Communist Party of India. He represented Kunnathoor constituency in 1st Kerala Legislative Assembly.

References

Communist Party of India politicians from Kerala
1925 births
2005 deaths
Kerala MLAs 1957–1959